Cristache Gheorghiu (born May 2, 1937) is a Romanian writer, painter, mechanical engineer and computer scientist.

In literature, Gheorghiu is best known as an essayist. An engineer by profession, he is known for his research on cybernetics.  In the latter part of his life Gheorghiu has devoted himself to literature and art.

Biography
Gheorghiu was born in Roman, Romania, the son of Victor and Aurora Gheorghiu (born Vintilă). Victor Gheorghiu was an officer in the Romanian army who died in 1941 during the invasion of the Soviet Union in Odessa. 

Cristache Gheorghiu attended the Lyceum Roman Voda, in Roman. He graduated from Gheorghe Asachi Technical University in 1959, with a master's degree in engineering. Gheorghiu  worked as a mechanical engineer in Romanian enterprises and as a master designer in the County Institute of Design “Prahova”.In 1970, Gheorghiu switched his profession to computer science, as a result of attending the courses organised by C.I.I. France, from which Romania has bought the license for producing electronic computers. 

Gheorghiu has published numerous scientific research articles. The main theme of his researches was "Territorial Information System". As recognition of his contribution, his name is mentioned in "The history of Science in Romania", the chapter "Cybernetics", and two of his scientific works has been selected in "Study of the Romanian Contribution in the Development of Cybernetics", (Publishing House of the Romanian Academy, 1981).

Gheorghiu has had numerous personal exhibitions and there are his paintings in many private collections or decorating public spaces. In literature he is known particularly as an essayist, his books – novels, travel notes or essays as it – always having deeper connotations than the apparent form the wording. He created and maintained the electronic publication "ADVERSA RES – a magazine of cultural confluences", where he used to comment the main cultural events from Brasov, where he moved in 1972. After retirement, he settled in Athens, Greece.

Books
 U.S.A. '95, (in Romanian)
 Singur printre americani (in Romanian)
 America After America (in English)
 Intre doua idealuri (in Romanian)
 Traditie sau liberul arbitru? (in Romanian language)
 Where Is My Way? (in English language)
 Remanente informatice (Scientific researches, in Romanian )
 Memoriile unui catel adult (in Romanian)
 asFORisme - un fel de cugetari (in Romanian)
 asFORisme - A Kind of Thoughts
 Filosofia unui bolovan (in Romanian)
 Grecia - note de calatorie (in Romanian)
 America after America, JustFiction Edition, Germany, 2012, (in English)
 Scrisori din Atena, Editura Pastel, 2012 (in Romanian)
 A Boulder’s Philosophy, Bibliotastic, New York, 2012, (in English)
 With Love from Athens, 2012, (in English)
 Anastasia, 2013, (in Romanian)
 Anastasia, 2013, (in English)
 asFORisme 2 - A Kind of Thoughts, 2013,
 asFORisme 2 - Un fel de cugetari, 2013, (in Romanian)
 Eseuri vesele si triste, 2014, (in Romanian)
 Cautari, 2014, (in Romanian language)
 Dictionar roman-grec de verbe pentru incepatori, 2015, (in Romanian)
 Dupa 50 de ani, 2015, (in Romanian)
 Memoria timpului pierdut, 2016, (in Romanian)
 asFORisme 3 - Un fel de cugetari, 2016, (in Romanian)
 asFORisme 3 - A Kind of Thoughts, 2016
 Filosofia unui bolovan, volumul 2, 2018, (in Romanian)
 Maieutica de buzunar, 2019, (in Romanian)

Scientific works in Romanian 
 Sistem expert în cobalto-terapia tumorilor maligne - Academia RSR, al IV-lea „Colocviu de Sisteme şi Cibernetică”,București 19–20 octombrie 1987

 Cibernetica evoluţiei sistemelor socio-teritoriale – Academia R.S.R., al 3-lea Congres Naţional de Cibernetică,București 1985,

 Modelarea asistată de calculator a evoluţiei sistemelor socio-teritoriale – Academia R.S.R., Academia de StudiiEconomice, a III-a Conferinţă Naţională de Cibernetică, 3-4 octombrie 1985

 Modelarea unor probleme ale conducerii teritoriale - Institutul Central de Informatică, Sesiunea de comunicăriŞtiinţifice 29-31 octombrie 1984

 Principiul remanenţei informaţionale aplicat la conducerea sistemelor economice mari - Institutul Central de Informatică, Sesiunea de comunicări ştiinţifice I.C.I. 1981

 Modelarea şi simularea numerică a evoluţiei sistemelor economico-sociale - Institutul Central de Informatică, Raportde cercetare, 1980

 Încercări de simulare numerică a sistemelor economico-sociale – Institutul Central de Informatică, Sesiune jubiliară de comunicări ştiinţifice, 22-24 septembrie 1980

 Simularea evoluţiei indicatorilor economico-sociali ai localităţilor dintr-un judeţ - Institutul Central de Informatică, Raport de cercetare, noiembrie 1982, în cadrul temei de cercetare: „Sistem Informatic Teritorial”.

 Asupra problemei de clasificare automată – Institutul Central de Informatică, Sesiunea de Comunicări Ştiinţifice, 24-26 mai 1982

 Dinamica indicatorilor - Institutul Central de Informatică, consfătuire de lucru, Craiova 26-27 noiembrie 1981
 Metode statistico-matematice folosite în analiza stării de sănătate a copiilor - În colaborare cu dr. Vasile Moldovan, a VIII-a Sesiune de Creaţie Ştiinţifică şi Tehnică, Braşov 1979

 Tabloul de bord al conducătorului în profil teritorial - a VIII-a Sesiune de Creaţie Ştiinţifică şi Tehnică, Braşov 1979
 Dinamica indicatorilor - Al IV-lea Simpozion „Informatică şi conducere”, Cluj-Napoca 10-13 mai 1978
 Despre câteva principii antientropice în evoluţia sistemelor de producţie – Universitatea Braşov, Sesiunea ştiinţifică a cadrelor didactice a Universităţii Braşov, 15-17 februarie 1974

 Simularea fabricaţiei cu aplicaţii în programarea producţiei - Universitatea Craiova, Sesiunea de comunicări ştiinţifice 24-25 noiembrie 1973

 Algoritm şi program pentru rezolvarea matricelor simetrice puternic diagonale (criteriul Witmayer) - Studiu efectuat pentru Direcţia pentru Sistematizarea, Arhitectura şi Proiectarea Construcţiilor, judeţul Prahova, 1970

Published works

 Cibernetica evoluţiei sistemelor socio-teritoriale – comunicare ştiinţifică selectată în cartea „CIBERNETICA”, Editura Academiei, 1988

 Sistem expert în cobalto-terapia tumorilor maligne - Academia RSR, Rezumatele comunicărilor celui de al IV-lea„Colocviu de Sisteme şi Cibernetică”, București 19-20 octombrie 1987

 Principiul remanenţei informaţionale aplicat la conducerea sistemelor economice mari - Revista de Statistică nr. 8 –August 1981

 Modelarea şi simularea numerică a evoluţiei sistemelor sociale, Raport de cercetare - Institutul Central de Informatică,1980

 Modelarea şi simularea numerică a evoluţiei sistemelor economico-sociale, un punct de vedere - Buletinul Român de Informatică, I.C.I. București, nr. 6/1980

 Analiza evoluţiei principalilor indicatori economici la un set de întreprinderi - Buletinul Informatic al Casei de Ştiinţă şi Tehnică pentru Tineret, Braşov, 1980

 Tablou de bord pentru conducerea activităţilor economice în profil teritorial – Produse informatice S.I.T., Institutul Central de Informatică, 1980

 Dinamica Indicatorilor – „Actualitatea în informatică şi conducere”, Cluj-Napoca, 1979
 soluţie pentru programarea producţiei - Revista Economică nr. 14 din septembrie 1974
 Programarea producţiei după o metodă dinamică – „Studii şi Cercetări de Calcul Economic şi Cibernetică Economică”, Academia de Studii Economice, București 1/1974

References
 "The history of Science in Romania", Cybernetics, Publishing House of Romanian Academy, 1981, pg. 151, 205, 220
 The Dictionary of Romanian Writers 2010 (Dictionarul scriitorilor romani de azi, 2011), pg. 221
 Romanian Literature. The Dictionary of Romanian Contemporary Authors, 2013 (Literatura romana. Dictionarul autorilor romani contemporani, Ed. "Arial", 2013)
 Nicolae Stoie, Biblioteca de unica folosinta, Editura "Gens Latina", 2012
 Ion Popescu Topolog, "Lictor - Lector", Ed. "Pastel", 2013, pg. 121-122
 Virgil Borcan, "Punct şi virgulă", Ed. „LucLibris”, 2013, pg. 38-39
 Pandemica, Antologie de proză scurtă, Editura BETTA, 2020, pr. 129-141
 Eugenia Duță, Impresii de cititor, Editura BETTA, 2020, pg. 129-135
 Elena Mitru, Arta in conversatie, Editura RAWEX COMS, 2022, pg. 114-133
 Elena Mitru, Portrete romanesti de peste ocean, volum IV, Editura RAWEX COMS, 2022, pg. 76-91
 Antologie de proza scurta, Povestiri in prag de Toamna, Editura BETTA. 2022, pg. 241-253
 http://www.aboutromania.com/arts.html
 http://issuu.com/emanuelpope/docs/itaca_nr._10_color?e=2417424/13803550 (ITACA-Dublin, Revista de cultura)
 https://www.morebooks.de - America after America
 http://www.bibliotastic.com/content/reviews/america-after-america
 Biblioteca Centrala Universitara Bucuresti: http://www.bcub.ro/
 Biblioteca Nationala a Romaniei: http://www.bibnat.ro
 https://web.archive.org/web/20160304094017/http://www.altii.home.ro/altii/Angela_Bratsou.htm - Singur printre americani
 https://web.archive.org/web/20160304072019/http://www.altii.home.ro/altii/Catalina_Stefanita.htm - Intre doua idealuri
 https://web.archive.org/web/20160304064802/http://www.altii.home.ro/altii/Carmen_Irimia_despre_Filosofia_unui_bolovan.htm
 http://fineart.brasov.tripod.com
 http://www.omnigraphies.com/GHEORGHIU%20Cristache
 Picture Gallery of "George Baritiu" Library - Album
 http://www.artactif.com/gheorghiu
 http://www.bibliotastic.com/genres/33
 https://web.archive.org/web/20100211070817/http://www.iubescbrasovul.ro/evenimente/expozitia-de-pictura-portrete-de-cristache-gheorghiu-la-libraria-okian/
 https://web.archive.org/web/20100709194008/http://www.editurapastel.ro/recomandari.htm
 
 https://web.archive.org/web/20100708225608/http://cultural.freehostia.com/carti/Prefata_RI.htm
 https://web.archive.org/web/20100217012130/http://www.mytex.ro/fapt-divers/personalitati-brasovene-in-portrete_247668.php
 https://web.archive.org/web/20100708223207/http://cultural.freehostia.com/altii/Comentariu_Silvia_Caloianu.htm
 http://www.tudor-art.com/main.php?category=artist&id=6439&language=0
 http://www.picturi.com/artisti/Cristache_Gheorghiu/picturi/
 https://web.archive.org/web/20100202083418/http://artwanted.com/artist.cfm?artid=1934

External links
 https://web.archive.org/web/20140505075826/http://cristache.webs.com/

1937 births
Romanian novelists
Romanian male novelists
Living people